Clapham North is an Underground station in Clapham, London. It is on the Northern line between Clapham Common and Stockwell. The station is located in Travelcard Zone 2, at the northern end of Clapham High Street, and a short walk away from Clapham High Street railway station. Although there is no direct interchange between the two, it is counted as an Out of Station Interchange using Oyster, so journeys involving a change between the two are charged as through journeys and not two separate journeys.

History

The station opened as Clapham Road on 3 June 1900 as part of an extension of the City and South London Railway to Clapham Common, one stop to the south. The station, designed by T. P. Figgis, is one of two remaining stations that has an island platform in the station tunnel, serving both the northbound and southbound lines; the other being Clapham Common. The original station building was replaced in 1924, when the line was modernised and the original building was remodelled by Charles Holden. The ticket hall was rebuilt after the installation of escalators and Figgis's station facade was replaced with biscuit-cream faience slabs and black coping tiles to the parapet walls. In turn, the station's corner entrance block was reclad in post-modern style tiles in c1996, the lower side wings retain their 1920s elevations. The station's name was changed to Clapham North on 13 September 1926 after the line was extended to Morden that year.

Clapham North is one of eight London Underground stations which has a deep-level air-raid shelter beneath it.

Connections
London Buses routes 50, 88, 155, 322, 345, P5 and night route N155 serve the station.

References

External links

Northern line stations
Tube stations in the London Borough of Lambeth
Former City and South London Railway stations
Railway stations in Great Britain opened in 1900
Clapham
London Underground Night Tube stations